Helensburgh Hockey Club is a field hockey club based in Argyll & Bute, Scotland. They were founded in 1974 as a men's hockey club, and expanded to include a ladies club in 1983. They play their home games at Hermitage Academy in Helensburgh and the 3 men's teams compete in the West District Men's Hockey leagues.

History

Formation of Club
Helensburgh Hockey Club was founded on 20 April 1974 by a group of former Hermitage Academy pupils looking to continue hockey after school. A prominent member among them was John Steele who played for the club from the very beginning. John, along with Ravi Khosla and John Andrews were the main members credited with starting Helensburgh Hockey Club. The first recorded game for the club was actually a month before its official formation. They played in a friendly against Hillhead - a match which they won 2-0. The club entered the West District Division 2 and played there first competitive game against East Kilbride, winning 4-0. The club enjoyed early success winning the 2nd division two years in a row (for some reason they didn't get promoted). The popularity of the sport in town grew rapidly and the club managed to start fielding a 2nd XI. The 2nd XI's first recorded game was a friendly win against Uddingston in 1974, however they didn't enter the league until 1980, with a 4-0 win over Whitecraigs

Many players at the club had strong navy links due to the close proximity of HMNB Clyde. The club used the facilities at HMNB Clyde for playing, training and after match teas.

During the late 70's and early 80's, the club bounced between the 1st division and the 2nd division in the West District. In 1983-84, the club finished in its highest ever league position, finishing 2nd under the command of Robert Henderson. In season 1980-81, the 2nd XI joined the newly created 4th division and under the leadership of Jim Riach and Jeremy Nicol, achieved as high as 2nd place.

Ladies XI
In 1982-83, the club started a ladies team. They entered the West District Women's division 6 and were an instant hit. Between 1983-84 and 1988-89 they earned successive promotions from division 6 to division 1. This impressive run halted when they reached division 1, and they were relegated in 1988-89, however it was a fantastic achievement nonetheless.

After a number of seasons in the 2nd division, they had there most successful stint in 1994-95, winning the west district division 1. As district champions, they were then offered the chance to play in the National League. The decision to go national was a massive club decision and was eventually turned down by the club. This led to a number of the ladies leaving Helensburgh Hockey Club and creating their own Helensburgh Ladies, a separate entity. The ladies XI of Helensburgh Hockey Club eventually dwindled away and by the year 2000, Helensburgh was just a men's club again.

Developing the Club
The ladies XI were doing fantastically well and although the men's 2nd XI had folded, the 1st XI was enjoying some success of its own. They continued to bounce up and down between division 1 and 2, however in 1993-94 season they started there longest stint in the first division, of 9 years. They achieved a 3rd-place finish in 1994-95, under captain Barry Cox.

An increased buzz about the club, and the tireless effort of Barry Cox and Andy Richardson lead the club the starting a 2nd XI again in 1998-99. This, coupled with the start of the Junior club, in turn, lead to the start of a 3rd XI in 2004-05. Success on the pitch has been hard to come by. The club made it to the semi-final of the reserve cup in 2007-08 and in the 2017-18 season the 1st XI won the 2nd division.

Location
The club has never had its own home in Helensburgh having played at HMNB Clyde, Hermitage Academy and Lomond School pitches. Many venues have been used as the clubhouse, including the Ardencaple hotel, the Pinewood, the Cairndhu, Helensburgh Rugby Club and currently Craighelen Lawn Tennis & Squash Club.

Honours

Major Honours

1st XI

West District 1st Division

Runners-up (1): 1983-84
Third Placed (1): 1994-95

Ladies XI

West District 1st Division

Winners (1): 1994-95
Runners-up (1):1993-94
District Cup (4): 1986-87, 1992–93, 1993–94, 1994-95

Minor Honours

1st XI

West District Division 2

Winners (5): 1974-75, 1975–76, 1979–80, 1982–83, 2017–18
Runners-up (1): 1990-91
Third Placed (2): 2003-04, 2007–08

2nd XI

West District Division 3

Third Placed (1): 2013-14

West District 4th Division

Runners-up (3): 1982-83, 1988–89, 2004–05

3rd XI

West District 4th Division

Runners-up (1): 2016-17

Club Records

Team Records

Biggest Wins
1st XI 12-0 Uddingston - 14 February 2018 - West District 2nd Division
2nd XI 11-0 Clydesdale - 29 September 2018 - West District 3rd Division
3rd XI 5-0 Western - 10 October 2016 - West District 3rd Division
Ladies XI 12-0 Hyndland - 8 October 1994 - West District 1st Division

Biggest Defeats
1st XI 12-0 Anchor - 6 October 2012 - West District 1st Division
2nd XI 9-0 Rottenrow - 26 February 2011 - West District 3rd Division
3rd XI 15-0 Rottenrow - 24 October 2009 - West District 4th Division

Player Records

Most Recorded Appearances
Robert Henderson - 290
John Friel - 270
Gordon Black - 254

Most Goals
Barry Cox - 121 (235)
Jonathan Cox - 115 (127)
Jamie Caulfield - 81(138)

References

Argyll and Bute
Scottish field hockey clubs
1974 establishments in Scotland
Field hockey clubs established in 1974
Sport in Scotland